Image Engine (also known as Image Engine Design Inc.) is a visual effects and animation studio based in Vancouver, British Columbia, Canada. Founded in 1995, the studio specializes in character/creature design and animation, digital environments, VFX supervision, and concept art among other services. In 2010, the company was nominated for an Academy Award for Best Visual Effects for their work on District 9. Since then they have contributed to feature films and television series including Jurassic World, Straight Outta Compton, Game of Thrones, Chappie, Logan, Spider-Man: Far From Home, and Pokémon Detective Pikachu.

In August 2015 it was announced that Image Engine had merged with fellow visual effects and feature animation studio, Cinesite.

Credits

2022
Fantastic Beasts: The Secrets of Dumbledore

2021
Venom: Let There Be Carnage
Chaos Walking

2020 
The Old Guard
Project Power
Mulan
Birds of Prey
Bloodshot
Underwater

2019 
The Mandalorian
Spider-Man: Far From Home
John Wick: Chapter 3 - Parabellum
Pokémon Detective Pikachu

2018 
Overlord
Fantastic Beast: The Crimes of Grindelwald
Skyscraper
Kin
Tully
Jurassic World: Fallen Kingdom
Lost in Space (2018 TV series): (#1. 10)
Lost in Space (2018 TV series): (#1. 6)
Lost in Space (2018 TV series): (#1. 2)
Lost in Space (2018 TV series): (#1. 1)
The X-Files (season 11): My Struggle III (#11. 1)

2017 
Thor: Ragnarok
Game of Thrones (season 7): The Dragon and the Wolf (#7. 7)
Game of Thrones (season 7): Eastwatch (#7. 5)
Game of Thrones (season 7): The Spoils of War (#7. 4)
Game of Thrones (season 7): Dragonstone (#7. 1)
Detroit
Power Rangers
Logan

2016
Assassin's Creed
Fantastic Beasts and Where to Find Them
Kingsglaive: Final Fantasy XV
Independence Day: Resurgence
Game of Thrones (season 6): The Winds of Winter (#6. 10) 
Game of Thrones (season 6): Battle of the Bastards (#6. 9) 
Game of Thrones (season 6): No One (#6. 8) 
Game of Thrones (season 6): The Broken Man (#6. 7) 
Game of Thrones (season 6): Blood of My Blood (#6. 6) 
Game of Thrones (season 6): The Door (#6. 5) 
Game of Thrones (season 6): Book of the Stranger (#6. 4) 
Game of Thrones (season 6): Oathbreaker (#6. 3) 
Game of Thrones (season 6): Home (#6. 2) 
Game of Thrones (season 6): The Red Woman (#6. 1) 
Captain America: Civil War
The X-Files (season 10)
Deadpool

2015
The Revenant
Point Break
The Man in the High Castle (TV series)
The Last Witch Hunter
Straight Outta Compton
Jurassic World
San Andreas
Game of Thrones (season 5): Mother's Mercy (#5. 10) 
Game of Thrones (season 5): The Dance of Dragons (#5. 9) 
Game of Thrones (season 5): The Gift (#5. 7) 
Game of Thrones (season 5): Unbowed, Unbent, Unbroken (#5. 6) 
Game of Thrones (season 5): Sons of the Harpy (#5. 4) 
Game of Thrones (season 5): The House of Black and White (5. 2) 
Game of Thrones (season 5): The Wars to Come (5.1) 
Child 44
Chappie

2014
American Sniper
Teenage Mutant Ninja Turtles

2013
Lone Survivor
Elysium
R.I.P.D.
White House Down
Now You See Me
Fast & Furious 6

2012
Zero Dark Thirty
Battleship
Safe House

2011
Immortals
The Thing
Apollo 18
Rise of the Planet of the Apes (previsualization)

2009
Stargate Universe (season 1): Pain (#1.17)
Stargate Universe (season 1): Space (#1.11)
Stargate Universe (season 1): Light (#1.5)
Stargate Universe (season 1): Darkness (#1.4)
The Twilight Saga: Eclipse
Aliens in the Attic
Night at the Museum: Battle of the Smithsonian
The Losers
District 9 
New in Town

2008

The Day the Earth Stood Still
The Incredible Hulk
Stone of Destiny
Another Cinderella Story
Lost Boys 2: The Tribe
Tunnel Rats 
Vantage Point
Snow Buddies 
Beverly Hills Chihuahua

2007
Mr. Magorium's Wonder Emporium
Fantastic Four: Rise of the Silver Surfer
Blades of Glory
Stargate SG-1: Dominion (#10.19) 
Stargate SG-1: Family Ties (#10.18) 
Stargate SG-1: Talion (#10.17) 
Stargate SG-1: Bad Guys (#10.16) 
Stargate SG-1: Bounty (#10.15) 
Stargate SG-1: The Shroud (#10.14) 
Stargate SG-1: Line in the Sand (#10.12) 
Stargate SG-1: The Quest: Part 2 (#10.11) 
White Noise 2: The Light
The Last Mimzy

2006
Night at the Museum
Stargate: Atlantis: Tao of Rodney (#3.14) 
Stargate: Atlantis: Echoes (#3.12) 
Stargate: Atlantis: The Return: Part 2 (#3.11) 
Stargate SG-1: The Quest: Part 1 (#10.10) 
Stargate SG-1: Company of Thieves (#10.9) 
Stargate SG-1: Counterstrike (#10.7) 
Stargate: Atlantis: The Real World (#3.6) 
Stargate SG-1: 200 (#10.6) 
Stargate SG-1: Uninvited (#10.5) 
Three Moons Over Milford: Pilot (#1.1) 
Stargate: Atlantis: Sateda (#3.4) 
Stargate SG-1: Insiders (#10.4) 
Stargate SG-1: The Pegasus Project (#10.3) 
Stargate SG-1: Morpheus (#10.2) 
Stargate SG-1: Flesh and Blood (#10.1) 
Slither 
Stargate SG-1: Camelot (#9.20)" 
Stargate SG-1: The Scourge (#9.17)" 
Stargate SG-1: Off the Grid (#9.16)" 
Stargate SG-1: Ethon (#9.15)" 
Stargate SG-1: Stronghold (#9.14)" 
Stargate: Atlantis: Inferno (#2.19)" 
Stargate SG-1: Ripple Effect (#9.13)" 
Stargate SG-1: The Fourth Horseman: Part 2 (#9.11)"

2005
Stargate: Atlantis: The Hive (#2.11)" 
Stargate SG-1: The Fourth Horseman: Part 1 (#9.10)" 
Stargate: Atlantis: Instinct (#2.7)" 
Stargate SG-1: Ex Deus Machina (#9.7)" 
Stargate SG-1: Beachhead (#9.6)" 
Stargate SG-1: The Powers That Be (#9.5)" 
Stargate SG-1: The Ties That Bind (#9.4)" 
Stargate SG-1: Origin (#9.3)" 
Stargate: Atlantis: The Intruder (#2.2)" 
Stargate SG-1: Avalon: Part 2 (#9.2)" 
Stargate: Atlantis: The Siege: Part 3 (#2.1)" 
Stargate SG-1: Avalon: Part 1 (#9.1)" 
Stargate SG-1: Moebius: Part 2 (#8.20)" 
Stargate SG-1: Moebius: Part 1 (#8.19)" 
Stargate SG-1: Reckoning: Part 2 (#8.17)" 
Stargate SG-1: Reckoning: Part 1 (#8.16)" 
Sci Fi Lowdown: Behind the Stargate - Secrets Revealed  (TV)

2004
Taxi
I, Robot 
Scooby-Doo 2: Monsters Unleashed

2003
X2: X-Men United

1997
Stargate SG-1

1994
Metro Cafe

See also
 Moving Picture Company (MPC)
 Digital Domain
 DNEG
 Framestore
 Sony Pictures Imageworks
 Rhythm & Hues
 Weta Digital
 Industrial Light & Magic

References

External links
Image Engine's website

Visual effects companies
Canadian animation studios
Technology companies of Canada
Companies based in Vancouver
Canadian companies established in 1995
Technology companies established in 1995
1995 establishments in British Columbia